Koyamada (written: 小山田 lit. "Small hill field") is a Japanese surname. Notable people with the surname include:

, Japanese rock climber
, American actor
Koyamada clan, Japanese clan

See also
Koyamada International Foundation, an international non-governmental organization
, Japanese surname using the same kanji

Japanese-language surnames